Catancyla is a genus of moths of the family Crambidae. It contains only one species, Catancyla brunnea, which is found in Australia, where it has been recorded from Western Australia.

References

Crambinae
Crambidae genera
Monotypic moth genera
Taxa named by George Hampson
Taxa described in 1919